Video City was a DVD rental retailer in Northern Ireland with 24 stores across the province. The chain also had tanning facilities, such as "The Tanning Studio", and also was a franchisee of Mauds Ice Cream.

The chain's main competitor was Xtra-vision.

External links
Company website

Retail companies established in 1987
Retail companies disestablished in 2018
Companies of Northern Ireland